Apollo (1879–1887) was a champion American Thoroughbred racehorse who won the 1882 Kentucky Derby. He was the only horse to have won the Derby without racing at age two until Justify equalled the achievement in 2018. Apollo went on to race 21 times as a three-year-old, 30 times as a four-year-old, and 4 times as a five-year-old. He won a total of 24 races.

Background
Apollo was bred by Daniel Swigert, who subsequently founded Elmendorf Farm. Apollo's dam was Rebecca T. Price, who had earlier produced stakes-winner Mahlstick. At the advanced age of 20, Rebecca T. Price was bred to two stallions, Ashstead and Lever. Her resulting foal of 1879 was a chestnut colt, subsequently gelded, with a white sock on his left hind leg. As DNA testing was not available at the time, his paternity was typically listed with both stallions named. The pedigree available on Equineline.com, run by The Jockey Club, shows Ashstead as the sire. However, Apollo was said to resemble Lever's sire, Lexington, more closely, leading to the common belief that Lever was Apollo's sire.

Originally trained for Swigert by Henry Brown, Apollo was injured as a two-year-old. He was then sold to trainer Green B. Morris and his partner James D. Patton for $1,200.

Racing career
Unraced at age two, Apollo made his first three starts as a three-year-old in April 1882 in New Orleans. He finished second in his first start on April 11 in the Pickwick Stakes, run at a distance of  miles. He then finished second in a couple of one-mile heats a week later. On April 26, he broke his maiden in the Cottrill Stakes over a distance of  miles.

On May 16, Apollo entered the 1882 Kentucky Derby, then run at a distance of  miles, as part of a field of fourteen. The 4-5 favorite was Runnymede, a multiple stakes winner, while Apollo was grouped with two other horses as a field entry at 10–1. Apollo broke near the back of the pack but worked his way up to sixth after a mile. Runnymede was in third, positioned on the outside to avoid traffic. Turning into the stretch, Runnymede made his move and took the lead in deep stretch, looking the likely winner. However, Apollo closed with a "cyclonic rush" and caught up in the final strides, winning by half a length.

The two horses met up again just six days later in the Clark Stakes, with Runnymede winning "in a canter" while Apollo finished third. Runnymede and Belmont Stakes winner Forester were retroactively acknowledged as the co-champion three-year-olds of 1882. Apollo had a solid season himself, winning a total of ten races from 21 starts and only finishing out of the money once. In addition to the Derby and his maiden win in the Cottrill Stakes, he also won the Coal, St. Leger, Drummers and Montgomery Stakes.

As a four-year-old in 1883, Apollo started 30 times, winning fourteen of them, including the Merchant Stakes. He also finished second seven times and had six third-place finishes. In September alone, he won seven consecutive races.

Retirement and death
Apollo was injured as a five-year-old and was retired from racing. He was given to a friend of Morris' wife that lived in Charleston for use as a saddle horse. He died in November 1887 of lockjaw.

Pedigree

The pedigree shown here assumes Apollo was sired by Ashstead rather than Lever.

References

External links
 Longshot Apollo wins the Kentucky Derby, 1882

Racehorses bred in Kentucky
Racehorses trained in the United States
Kentucky Derby winners
1879 racehorse births
1887 racehorse deaths
Thoroughbred family A15